Atef Dkhili (born 4 April 1990) is a Tunisian footballer who plays for Club Africain.

Atef Dkhili began his club career playing for Jendouba Sport, where he was formed as a youth player.

In 2008, he joined Club Africain for his first spell in the Tunisian league

International career 
Atef Dkhili has joined to the Tunisian national team in 2012.

References

External links
 

1990 births
Living people
Place of birth missing (living people)
Tunisian footballers
Association football goalkeepers
Club Africain players
Olympique Béja players